Buena Vista, meaning "good view" in Spanish, may refer to:

Places

Canada 
Bonavista, Newfoundland and Labrador, with the name being originally derived from “Buena Vista”
Buena Vista, Saskatchewan
Buena Vista, Saskatoon, a neighborhood in the city of Saskatoon
Buena Vista Road, Edmonton

United States 
Buena Vista, Alabama
Buena Vista, California (disambiguation)
Buena Vista, Amador County, California
Buena Vista, former name of Buttonwillow, California, in Kern County
Buena Vista, Mariposa County, California, a place in California
Buena Vista, Nevada County, California
Buena Vista, San Jose, Santa Clara County
Buena Vista, Sonoma County, California, a place in California
Buena Vista, Tehama County, California, a place in California
Buena Vista, former name of Visalia, California, in Tulare County
Buena Vista, Colorado
Buena Vista (St. Georges, Delaware), listed on the NRHP in Delaware
Buena Vista (Miami), a neighborhood in Miami, Florida
Buena Vista, Georgia
Buena Vista, Illinois
Buena Vista Township, Schuyler County, Illinois
Buena Vista, Franklin County, Indiana
Buena Vista, Gibson County, Indiana
Buena Vista, Harrison County, Indiana
Buena Vista, Randolph County, Indiana
Buena Vista County, Iowa
North Buena Vista, Iowa
Buena Vista, Kentucky
Buena Vista (Stonewall, Louisiana), listed on the NRHP in Louisiana
Buena Vista (Leonardtown, Maryland), listed on the NRHP in Maryland
Buena Vista, Michigan
Buena Vista, Kent County, Michigan
Buena Vista Charter Township, Michigan
Buena Vista, Mississippi
Buena Vista, Ohio (disambiguation), several places in this state with this name
 Buena Vista, Fayette County, Ohio
 Buena Vista, Hocking County, Ohio
 Buena Vista, Scioto County, Ohio
Buena Vista, Oregon
Buena Vista, Pennsylvania
Buena Vista, Tennessee
Buena Vista, Virginia
Buena Vista (Roanoke, Virginia), listed on the NRHP in Virginia
Buena Vista (Washington, D.C.), a neighborhood of Washington, D.C.
Buena Vista, Wisconsin (disambiguation)
Buena Vista, Grant County, Wisconsin
Buena Vista, Portage County, Wisconsin
Buena Vista, Richland County, Wisconsin
Buena Vista, Waukesha County, Wisconsin
Buena Vista Historic District (Kentucky), Newport, Kentucky, listed on the NRHP in Campbell County, Kentucky
Buena Vista Historic District (Tennessee), Nashville, Tennessee, listed on the NRHP in Davidson County, Tennessee
Buena Vista Lake, now drained, in Kern County, California
Buena Vista Lake Bed, a watershed within the Great Basin in Buena Vista Valley
Buena Vista Oil Field, in Kern County, California
Buena Vista Park, a park in the Haight-Ashbury and Buena Vista Heights neighborhoods of San Francisco, California
Buena Vista Township (disambiguation)
Buena Vista Valley, Pershing County, Nevada
Buena Vista Wildlife Area, Wisconsin
Lake Buena Vista, Florida
Montgomery-Janes-Whittaker House, commonly known as Buena Vista, listed on the NRHP in Autauga County, Alabama

Puerto Rico 
 Buena Vista, Bayamón, Puerto Rico, a barrio
 Buena Vista, Hatillo, Puerto Rico, a barrio
 Buena Vista, Humacao, Puerto Rico, a barrio
 Buena Vista, Las Marías, Puerto Rico, a barrio
 Buena Vista, Carolina, Puerto Rico, a barrio

Other places
 Buena Vista, Catamarca, Argentina
 Buena Vista, Corozal, Corozal District, Belize
 Buena Vista, Ichilo, Bolivia
 Bay of Buena Vista, Cuba
 Buena Vista, Dominican Republic, in Jarabacoa, La Vega Province
 Buena Vista Barracks and Battery, Gibraltar
 Buena Vista, Coahuila, Mexico; site of the 1847 Battle of Buena Vista
 Buena vista beach, in Los Cabos Municipality, Baja California Sur
 Buena Vista, Colón, Colón Province, Panama
 Buena Vista, Paraguay
 Buena Vista, Peru, an archaeological site
  Buena Vista or Vatilau, an island in the Nggela Islands, Central Province, Solomon Islands

Other uses
Battle of Buena Vista, a battle in the Mexican–American War fought in 1847 in Buena Vista, Coahuila, Mexico
"Buena Vista" (song), a song by Gomez from their 2000 compilation album Abandoned Shopping Trolley Hotline
Buena Vista (horse) (born 2006), Japanese Thoroughbred racehorse
Buena Vista Cafe, a café in San Francisco, California, credited with introducing Irish coffee to the United States
Buena Vista Winery, a winery in Sonoma, California, United States
Buena Vista Pictures Distribution, the former name of Walt Disney Studios Motion Pictures used until 2007
Buena Vista (brand), a Walt Disney brand, discontinued as a trade name in 2009
Buena Vista International, a international distributor of Walt Disney Studios Motion Pictures
Buena Vista University, Storm Lake, Iowa

See also 
Buena Vista Social Club (disambiguation)
Buena Vista Park (disambiguation)
Buenavista (disambiguation)
Bonavista (disambiguation)
Boa Vista (disambiguation)
Buona Vista (disambiguation)